Shahrak-e Sanati-ye Eshtahard (also Romanized as Shahraḵ-e Sanʿatī Eshtahārd) is a village in Palangabad Rural District, Palangabad District, Eshtehard County, Alborz Province, Iran. At the 2006 census, its population was 1,510, in 563 families.

References 

Populated places in Eshtehard County